Bajramović is a Bosniak surname, derived from bajram, a Turkism meaning "Eid al-Fitr". It may refer to:

Emir Bajramović (born 1980), Bosnian volleyball player at the highest national level
Denis Bajramović (born 1961), Croatian basketball coach and former player
Halil Bajramović (born 1971), Bosnian businessman
Indira Bajramović, Roma activist and economist
Ismet Bajramović (1966–2008), Bosnian soldier and reputed organized crime figure from Sarajevo
Kenan Bajramović (born 1981), Bosnian basketball player who currently plays for Banvit B.K. in Turkey
Mensur Bajramović (born 1965), Bosnian professional basketball coach
Šaban Bajramović (1936–2008), Serbian-Romani musician
Sead Bajramović (born 1973), Serbia-born Bosnian professional football player
Sejdo Bajramović (1927–1994), Yugoslav soldier and politician of the former Yugoslavia
Šener Bajramović (born 1950), Bosnian football player and manager
Zlatan Bajramović (born 1979), German-born Bosnian footballer

Bosnian surnames